Michael V. Saxl is American lawyer and former politician from Maine. Saxl, who lived in Portland's West End, was a member of the Maine House of Representatives from the 117th – 120th legislatures (1995–2002). He was Speaker of the Maine House of Representatives from 2001–02. He is a Democrat.

Saxl, a native of Bangor, was elected in a special election in February 1995 to replace Jim Oliver, who resigned to join the Peace Corps. He won 61% of the vote, beating both a Republican and a Green Independent. He was a second year law student at the time of election and son of fellow State Representative Jane Saxl of Bangor.

Saxl was elected Speaker of the Maine House of Representatives at the age of 33, the youngest Speaker since John L. Martin was elected at 32.

After leaving the Maine House of Representatives, Saxl became a lobbyist, including Winter Harbor Properties, a real estate firm.

Positions
Saxl opposed term limits for elected officials in Maine.

References

Year of birth missing (living people)
Living people
Speakers of the Maine House of Representatives
Democratic Party members of the Maine House of Representatives
Majority leaders of the Maine House of Representatives
Politicians from Portland, Maine
Maine lawyers
Politicians from Bangor, Maine
University of Maine School of Law alumni